Ilmen Nature Reserve (also Ilmensky) is a Russian 'zapovednik' (strict nature reserve) that was created by decree of Vladimir Lenin, in 1920 as a mineralogical nature reserve.  It is the site of deposits of many rare-earth minerals - 16 minerals were first discovered here, including Ilmenite (named for the site), Monazite, Cancrinite, and Samarskite-(Y).  There have been over 400 mines in the area over the years.  The Reserve's geological museum is one of the largest in Russia.  The forest cover is pine and larch forest on low hills of the Ilmensky Mountains and foothill ridges on east side of the south Ural Mountains.  The reserve is situated just north and east of the city of Miass, in the Chebarkulsky District of Chelyabinsk Oblast.  It is also 20 kkm east of Taganay National Park and 75 km west of Chelyabinsk.

Topography 
The Ilmensky Reserve is located on the east slope of the southern Urals, where the terrain flattens from low mountains (400 meters altitude) to a district of lakes and rolling hills.  The reserve is rectangular in shape, 70 km from north to south, and 10 km from west to east.  The Miass River runs north-south along the west border of the reserve.  The highest point, Ilmen Tau, is 750 meters above sea level.

The geology is a complex assortment of igneous and metamorphic rock.  The granitic formations contain many pegmatite veins with associated minerals.  The reserve has recorded 278 species of minerals, and 70 kinds of rock.

Climate and Ecoregion
Ilmen is located in the Kazakh forest steppe ecoregion.  Steppe with long ""ribbon forests"" of pine; about 300–500 miles more northerly than the European Russian forest. This ecoregion has more wetlands and more continental climate than the European forest steppe.

The climate of Ilmen is Humid continental climate, warm summer (Köppen climate classification (Dfb)). This climate is characterized by large swings in temperature, both diurnally and seasonally, with mild summers and cold, snowy winters.  Rainfall varies from 500 to 800 mm per year, peaking in the summer.  Snow reaches a depth of 1 meter, with snow cover averaging 195 days. The frost-free period lasts 80–90 days.

Flora and fauna 
The dark taiga is to the west, on the mountain ridges; Ilmen is more in a pine and birch forest subzone.  Forests cover 85% of the Reserve - of which 55% is pine (Pinus sylvestris), and about 40% birch. The remaining 5% is mostly meadow, and steppe.  Because 9% of the reserve is lake and river, the surrounding floodplains and dead birch trees provide a good habitat for mushrooms which are an object of study at the site.  Throughout the reserves history, the mammals and birds of the region have been the subject of frequent scientific publication.

Ecotourism
As a strict nature reserve, the Ilmen Reserve is mostly closed to the general public, although scientists and those with 'environmental education' purposes can make arrangements with park management for visits.   Other members of the public seeking access must apply to the main office in the city of Miass.

Mineralogical Museum
The Reserve's Natural Science Museum in the city of Miass, created in 1925, is one of the five largest Russian geological-mineralogical museums. It is housed in a three-story building, with six rooms and a total area of 2,050 m2.  The Museum Foundation has 30 thousand units of storage, with 9000 on exhibit. The museum is a major regional center of education in the natural sciences, receiving 50 thousand visitors per year.

See also 
 List of Russian Nature Reserves (class 1a 'zapovedniks')

References

External links
  Map of Ilmensky Reserve, OpenStreetMap
 Map of Ilmensky Reserve, ProtectedPlanet

Nature reserves in Russia
Protected areas established in 1920
1920 establishments in Russia
Geography of Chelyabinsk Oblast
Zapovednik